This is a list of current and former electoral divisions for the Legislative Assembly of Queensland, the state legislature for Queensland, Australia.

Current Districts by region

Districts in Far North Queensland

Barron River
Cairns
Cook
Hill
Mulgrave

Districts in North Queensland

Burdekin
Hinchinbrook
Mundingburra
Thuringowa
Townsville
Traeger
Whitsunday

Districts in Central Queensland

Bundaberg
Burnett
Callide
Gladstone
Gregory
Hervey Bay
Keppel
Mackay
Maryborough
Mirani
Rockhampton

Districts in South-West Queensland

Condamine
Southern Downs
Toowoomba North
Toowoomba South
Warrego

Districts in South East Queensland

Greater Brisbane – Northern Districts

 Aspley
 Bancroft – (part of Moreton Bay)
 Clayfield
 Cooper
 Everton
 Ferny Grove – (mostly Moreton Bay)
 Kurwongbah – (part of Moreton Bay)
 McConnel
 Morayfield – (part of Moreton Bay)
 Murrumba – (part of Moreton Bay)
 Nudgee
 Pine Rivers – (part of Moreton Bay)
 Pumicestone – (part of Moreton Bay)
 Redcliffe – (part of Moreton Bay)
 Sandgate
 Stafford

Greater Brisbane – Southern Districts

 Algester
 Bulimba
 Chatsworth
 Greenslopes
 Inala
 Lytton
 Maiwar
 Mansfield
 Miller
 Moggill
 Mount Ommaney
 South Brisbane
 Stretton
 Toohey

Sunshine Coast

 Buderim
 Caloundra
 Glass House
 Gympie
 Kawana
 Maroochydore
 Nanango
 Nicklin
 Ninderry
 Noosa

Gold Coast

 Bonney
 Broadwater
 Burleigh
 Coomera
 Currumbin
 Gaven
 Mudgeeraba
 Mermaid Beach
 Southport
 Surfers Paradise
 Theodore

Remainder of Southeast

 Redlands – (part of Redland City)
 Capalaba – (part of Redland City)
 Oodgeroo – (part of Redland City)
 Ipswich – (part of City of Ipswich)
 Bundamba – (part of City of Ipswich)
 Ipswich West – (part of City of Ipswich)
 Jordan – (part of Logan City)
 Logan – (part of Logan City)
 Macalister – (part of Logan City)
 Springwood – (part of Logan City)
 Lockyer
 Waterford – (part of Logan City)
 Woodridge – (part of Logan City)
 Scenic Rim – (part of Scenic Rim Region)

History

1859–1864

The separation of Queensland as a separate colony in 1859 lead to the establishment of an initial 16 electoral districts, returning 26 members (that is, some elected multiple representatives, number of members in parentheses):

 Burnett (2)
 Drayton and Toowoomba (1)
 East Moreton (2)
 Eastern Downs (1)
 Hamlet of Fortitude Valley (1)
 Leichhardt (2)
 Maranoa (1)
 Northern Downs (1)
 Port Curtis (1)
 Town of Brisbane (3)
 Town of Ipswich (3)
 Town of South Brisbane (1)
 Warwick (1)
 West Moreton (3)
 Western Downs (2)
 Wide Bay (1)

Members elected during this period:
 Members of the Queensland Legislative Assembly, 1860–1863

1864–1872

In 1864, the Additional Members Act created  six more electoral districts, each with 1 member, resulting in the following set of electorates (number of members in parentheses):

 Burnett (2)
 Clermont (1) – new
 Drayton and Toowoomba (1)
 East Moreton (2)
 Eastern Downs (1)
 Hamlet of Fortitude Valley (1)
 Kennedy (1) – new
 Leichhardt (2)
 Maranoa (1)
 Maryborough (1) – new
 Mitchell (1) – new
 Northern Downs (1)
 Port Curtis (1)
 Rockhampton (1) – new
 Town of Brisbane (3)
 Town of Ipswich (3)
 Town of South Brisbane (1)
 Warrego (1) – new
 Warwick (1)
 West Moreton (3)
 Western Downs (2)
 Wide Bay (1)

This made a total of 22 electorates with 32 members.

Members elected for this period:
 Members of the Queensland Legislative Assembly, 1863–1867
 Members of the Queensland Legislative Assembly, 1867–1868
 Members of the Queensland Legislative Assembly, 1868–1870
 Members of the Queensland Legislative Assembly, 1870–1871
 Members of the Queensland Legislative Assembly, 1871–1873

1872–1878

The Electoral Districts Act (1872) resulted in 42 one-member electorates for the 1873 election, while in 1875 the Cook District Representation Act added the Electoral district of Cook.

Four electorates were renamed:
 Hamlet of Fortitude Valley became Fortitude Valley
 Town of Brisbane became Brisbane City
 Town of Ipswich became Ipswich
 Town of South Brisbane became South Brisbane

Two electorates were abolished:
 Eastern Downs
 Western Downs

Twenty-two new electorates were introduced at the 1873 elections (by the 1872 Act) plus Cook in 1876, resulting in the following set of electorates (number of members shown in parentheses) :

 Aubigny (1) – new
 Balonne (1) – new
 Blackall (1) – new
 Bowen (1) – new
 Bremer (1) – new
 Brisbane City (1, was 3) – renamed 
 Bulimba (1) – new
 Bundamba (1) – new
 Burke (1) – new
 Burnett (1, was 2)
 Carnarvon (1) – new
 Clermont (1) 
 Cook (1) – new from 1875
 Dalby (1) – new
 Darling Downs (1) – new
 Drayton and Toowoomba (1)
 East Moreton (1, was 2)
 Enoggera (1) – new
 Fassifern (1) – new
 Fortitude Valley (1) -renamed
 Gympie (1) – new
 Ipswich (1, was 3) – renamed
 Kennedy (1) 
 Leichhardt (1, was 2)
 Logan (1) – new
 Maranoa (1)
 Maryborough (1) 
 Mitchell (1) 
 Mulgrave (1) – new
 Normanby (1) – new
 Northern Downs (1)
 Oxley (1) – new
 Port Curtis (1)
 Ravenswood (1) – new
 Rockhampton (1) 
 South Brisbane (1) – renamed
 Springsure (1) – new
 Stanley (1) – new
 Warrego (1) 
 Warwick (1)
 West Moreton (1, was 3)
 Wickham (1) – new
 Wide Bay (1)

So 22 electorates with 2 abolished and 22 introduced resulted in 42 electorates each returning 1 member (1873) and 43 electorates each returning 1 member (1876).

Members elected during this period:
 Members of the Queensland Legislative Assembly, 1873–1878

1878–1900
Districts redistributed or renamed 1878 to 1900

 Barcoo (1885–1972)
 Brisbane North (1888–1912)
 Bulloo (1888–1912)
 Burrum (1888–1932)
 Cambooya (1888–1912)
 Carpentaria (1888–1960)
 Croydon (1893–1912)
 Eastern Downs (1860–1873)
 Cunningham (1888–2009)
 Fitzroy (1888-1960, 1992–2009)
 Flinders (1888–1932, 1950–1992)
 Gregory (1878–present)
 Herbert (1888–1950)
 Moreton (1878–1912)
 Murilla (1888–1935)
 Musgrave (1886–1923)
 North Brisbane (1878–1888)
 Nundah (1888–1992)
 Rockhampton North (1888–1912, 1960–1992)
 Rosewood (1878–1932)
 Toombul (1888–1932)
 Toowong (1888–1992)
 Woolloongabba (1888–1912)
 Woothakata (1888–1912)

1901–1949
Districts redistributed or renamed between 1901 and 1949

 Baroona (1935–1977)
 Brisbane (1912–1977)
 Buranda (1912–1960)
 Cooroora (1912–1992)
 Drayton (1912–1927)
 East Toowoomba (1912–1950)
 Eacham  (1912–1932)
 Hamilton (1932–1950)
 Isis (1932–1992)
 Ithaca (1912–1986)
 Kelvin Grove (1923–1960)
 Kurilpa (1912–1986)
 Maree (1912–1944)
 Merthyr (1912–1957)
 Mount Morgan (1912–1932)
 Paddington (1912–1932)
 Pittsworth (1912–1923)
 Queenton (1912–1932)
 The Tableland (1932–1950)
 Toowoomba (1912–1950)
 Windsor (1912–1992)

1950–2017
Districts redistributed or renamed between 1950 and 2017

 Albert (1960–2017)
 Archerfield (1972–1998)
 Ashgrove (1960–2017)
 Auburn (1972–1992)
 Barambah (1950–2001)
 Beaudesert (1992–2017)
 Belmont (1960-1977)
 Belyando (1950–1977)
 Brisbane Central (1977–2017)
 Broadsound (1986–1992)
 Caboolture (1977–2001)
 Charters Towers (1992–2009)
 Chermside (1950–1960, 1992–2001)
 Cleveland (1992–2017)
 Coorparoo (1950–1960)
 Crows Nest (1992–2001)
 Dalrymple (2009–2017)
 Darling Downs (2001–2009)
 Darlington (1950–1960)
 Haughton (1950–1960)
 Hawthorne (1960–1972)
 Indooroopilly (1992-2017)
 Ipswich East (1960–1972)
 Kedron (1950–1972, 1992–2001)
 Kurwongbah (1992–2009, 2017–present)
 Landsborough (1950–1992)
 Mackenzie (1950–1972)
 Manly (1986–1992)
 Marodian (1950–1960)
 Merrimac (1992–2001)
 Mooloolah (1992–2001)
 Mount Coot-tha (1950–2017)
 Mount Gravatt (1950–2009)
 Mount Isa (1972–2017)
 Mourilyan (1950–1992)
 Nash (1950–1960)
 Nerang (1986–2001)
 Norman (1950–1960)
 North Toowoomba (1950–1960)
 Peak Downs (1977–1992)
 Pine Rivers (1972–1992)
 Robina (2001–2009)
 Rockhampton South (1960–1969)
 Roma (1950–1992)
 Salisbury (1960–1992)
 Sherwood (1950–1992)
 Somerset (1950–1992)
 South Coast (1960–1992)
 Sunnybank (1992–2001; 2009–2017)
 Toowoomba East (1960–1972)
 Toowoomba South (1972–2008)
 Toowoomba West (1960–1972)
 Tablelands (1986–2009)
 Townsville East (1986–1992)
 Townsville North (1960–1972)
 Townsville South (1960–1986)
 Townsville West (1972–1992)
 Wavell (1960–1986)
 Wolston (1972–1992)
 Wynnum (1923–1986)
 Yeerongpilly (2001-2017)
 Yeronga (1950–1992)

References

External links
Maps and Districts at the Electoral Commission of Queensland website
Queensland Historical Atlas

 
Queensland-related lists
Queensland